Unicron is the only collaboration between American rappers MF DOOM and Trunks. The EP is produced by MF DOOM and features Trunks' rhyming. The album came into fruition after Trunks was featured in the song "Lockjaw" off of DOOM's album Take Me to Your Leader, under the alias King Geedorah. "Lockjaw" also appears in Unicron as track 3.

Unicron was never commercially released until 2022, instead it was made available as a bootleg on many websites. In 2022 De Rap Winkel released the EP as several numbered limited editions on vinyl.

Track listing

External links
 

2008 EPs
MF Doom albums